The Chola–Chalukya Wars were a series of battles that were fought from 992 CE to 1120 CE between the Chola Empire and the Western Chalukya Empire in what is now South India. Most of these conflicts were initiated by the Western Chalukyas who were defeated by the Cholas and forced to return to their capital. These recurring conflicts eventually exhausted as both empire, straining their manpower and material, were left vulnerable to other enemies.
More than 1,000,000 people were killed due to direct or indirect consequences of the war. The battles were rages on two fronts: the Western Front in which the capture of Manyakheta and Kalyani were the objectives of the Cholas, and the Eastern Front which centered around Vengi which was strategic for both sides. The west saw the heaviest fighting with Rajendra Chola I leading an army of 900,000 and defeating Jayasimha II  at the Battle of Maski (1019 CE-1020 CE). On the Eastern Front, Rajendra Chola led Rajaraja Chola I's army in Vengi and expelled the rulers in battle. Vengi was later the site of the coronation of Rajendra Chola's nephew following his victories in the Chola expedition to North India.

Chola conquests in the Chalukyan kingdom 
All the Chola–Chalukya battles took place in Southern (early battles) and Central (later battles) Chalukyan country and a few in Vengi which the Cholas dominated until the rise of Ganapati Deva of Kakatiya dynasty.

References
"Tennaattu Porkalangal" by Ka. Appaturaiyaar
"VeeraSozhiyam"
"Kalingattu Parani" by Jayankondaar
 our Karnataka
Chalukya wiki-Chalukya
 Indian inscriptions, Archaeological Society of India
"Prabandha-Chintamani" of Merutunga
Vijnanesvara's " Mitakshara"
Kirthi Verma's "Govaidya "
"Ajitapurana and Sahasabhimavijaya" of Ranna
Bilhana's "Vikramankadeva Charitha"

Chola Empire
History of Karnataka
Western Chalukya Empire
Battles involving the Chola Empire